The Sierra Madre Oriental is a mountain range in northeastern Mexico. The Sierra Madre Oriental is part of the American Cordillera, a chain of mountain ranges (cordillera) that consists of an almost continuous sequence of mountain ranges that form the western "backbone" of North America, Central America, South America, and Antarctica.

Setting
Spanning  the Sierra Madre Oriental runs from the Rio Grande on the border between Coahuila and Texas south through Nuevo León, southwest Tamaulipas, San Luis Potosí, Querétaro, and Hidalgo to northern Puebla, where it joins with the east-west running Eje Volcánico Transversal of central Mexico. The northernmost are the Sierra del Burro and the Sierra del Carmen which reach the border with the United States at the Rio Grande. North of the Rio Grande, the range continues northwestward into Texas and beyond as the Davis and Guadalupe Ranges.

Mexico's Gulf Coastal Plain lies to the east of the range, between the mountains and the Gulf of Mexico coast. The Mexican Plateau, which averages  in elevation, lies between the Sierra Madre Oriental and the Sierra Madre Occidental further west.

The climate of the Sierra Madre Oriental is drier than the rainforest areas further south. The Serranias del Burro in the northern range is much drier, semi-arid to arid, yet annually orographically induces and/or intensifies notably vigorous thunderstorm activity in April and May. This small region consistently is a particularly active area for supercells with significantly severe hail and tornadoes, which first form over to just leeward of the mountains then move eastward, sometimes hundreds of kilometres (miles) past the Rio Grande River into Texas.

Highest major summits

Ecology
This long range of tall mountains is noted for its abundant biodiversity and large number of endemic species of plants and wildlife, from the dry north to the wetter south. The Sierra Madre Oriental pine-oak forests are found at high elevations in the range ( above sea level). To the east, the Tamaulipan matorral occupies the range's lower slopes in Nuevo León and northern Tamaulipas, while the Veracruz moist forests cover the lower slopes of the central range, and the eastern slopes at the southern end of the range are home to the Veracruz montane forests. West of the range, the Mexican Plateau is home to deserts and xeric shrublands, including the Chihuahuan Desert to the north, the Meseta Central matorral on the central part of the plateau, and the Central Mexican matorral on the southern plateau.

Much of the wildlife can also be found in the Sierra Madre Occidental, which runs parallel to these mountains along western Mexico.

Flora
Pine-oak forests are dominated by several species of pine, such as Pinus nelsonii, P. cembroides, P. pseudostrobus, and P. arizonica, and oak, such as Quercus castanea and Q. affinis. Matorral is characterized by woody shrubs, small trees, cacti, and succulents. Montane chaparral is found above  and is home to species in the genera Quercus, Arbutus, Yucca, Cercocarpus and Bauhinia. Piedmont scrub occurs below  and is composed of plants  in height such as Helietta parvifolia, Neopringlea integrifolia and Acacia spp.

Fauna

Birds of the forest include the Mexican chickadee, Montezuma quail, Strickland's woodpecker, zone-tailed hawk and several species of jay.

Pine-oak forests in Coahuila are part of the migration route of monarch butterflies (Danaus plexippus).

Threats and conservation
Original habitats have been severely reduced by clearance for livestock grazing and logging over hundreds of years. Protected areas include the Cumbres de Monterrey National Park in Mexico and the Big Bend National Park in Texas. The El Cielo Biosphere in Tamaulipas preserves the northernmost tropical Veracruz moist forests in Mexico and extensive temperate cloud forests.

See also
 Mountain peaks of Mexico
 Sierra Madre Occidental

References

External links

 

 
Madre Oriental
Landforms of Coahuila
Landforms of Hidalgo (state)
Landforms of Nuevo León
Landforms of Puebla
Landforms of Querétaro
Landforms of San Luis Potosí
Landforms of Tamaulipas
Physiographic provinces